Muniz Freire Futebol Clube, commonly known as Muniz Freire, was a Brazilian football club based in Muniz Freire, Espírito Santo state. They competed in the Copa do Brasil once.

History
The club was founded on May 1, 1930. Muniz Freire won the Campeonato Capixaba Second Level in 1989, and the Campeonato Capixaba in 1991. They competed in the Copa do Brasil in 1992, when they were eliminated in the First Stage by Internacional. The club eventually folded.

Achievements

 Campeonato Capixaba:
 Winners (1): 1991
 Campeonato Capixaba Second Level:
 Winners (1): 1989

Stadium
Muniz Freire Futebol Clube played their home games at Estádio José Ibrahim Nicolau. The stadium has a maximum capacity of 5,000 people.

References

Association football clubs established in 1930
Defunct football clubs in Espírito Santo
1930 establishments in Brazil